The National Premier Leagues NSW is a semi-professional soccer competition in New South Wales, Australia. The competition is conducted by Football NSW, the organising body in New South Wales (the other being the National Premier Leagues Northern NSW organised by Northern NSW Football). The league is a subdivision of the second tier National Premier Leagues (NPL), which sits below the national A-League. Prior to becoming a subdivision of the NPL in 2013, the league was previously known as the NSW Premier League.

History

Origins
Since 1956, a top divisional New South Wales based league has been contested annually in various forms, with its early days remembered as Division One. The league, jointly with other state-based leagues, formed the highest tier of soccer in Australia until the creation of a national league, the National Soccer League (NSL), in 1977. Before NSL, the Ampol Cup also ran concurrently as a state-based cup competition. In 1979 Division One officially changed its name to NSW State League, however, reverted to NSW Division One by 1983. The league continued to be contested throughout the winter months and included another name change in 1992 to the NSW Super League. During the 1980s and 1990s, Melita Eagles and Blacktown City FC were dominant in the league winning nine championships between them.

Foundations
At the end of the 2000 season, the top soccer divisions were revamped with the highest level of soccer being named the Premier League and being played over the summer to align with the then top tier of soccer in Australia (NSL). The second highest NSW league was named the Winter Super League and played throughout 2001. The 2004–05 season saw the return of the New South Wales NSL giants in Sydney Olympic, Sydney United 58, Wollongong Wolves and Marconi Stallions. This was the result of another overhaul of the entire national league structure. The NSL was abolished and the A-League took its place at the top of the soccer hierarchy in Australia. As this competition significantly reduced the teams from New South Wales to just three (Sydney FC, Central Coast Mariners and Newcastle Jets) these clubs were forced to return to the state leagues. The NSW Premier League continued to be run over summer throughout this period but after the 2004–05 season reverted to a winter competition from 2006.

In 2008 the whole New South Wales men's, women's and youth competitions were reconstructed to align youth teams with their respective senior clubs along with women's teams.

Development
In 2013 the FFA announced another re-structure, this time to the tier 2 level of soccer in Australia. This saw the top league in each state united under a single banner called the National Premier Leagues, with the NSW Premier League rebranded as the National Premier Leagues NSW. Bonnyrigg White Eagles became the inaugural champions of this competition after defeating Rockdale City Suns 1–0 in the final. Sydney United 58 FC were crowned premiers after placing first in the standing at the end of the regular season, earning the right to compete in the inaugural National Premier Leagues Finals. Sydney United went on to win this tournament defeating Tasmanian side South Hobart FC 2–0 in the final. In 2014, premiers Bonnyrigg White Eagles failed to reach the grand final and Blacktown City FC were crowned champions. They defeated Sydney Olympic 2–1 after extra time.

Name Changes

Competition format

League
There are 30 Rounds in total with each team playing each other twice; home and away.

NPL national finals
At the completion of the league series, the NPL NSW top of the table joins the winners from the other NPL subdivisions in a national eight team finals series.  The national final series consists of a three-round knock-out series based on geographically close subdivision champions playing each other, culminating in a grand final.

Clubs
The following clubs were competing in the National Premier Leagues NSW for the 2023 season.

National Premier Leagues NSW Men's 1 Honours

Notes:

 Bold indicates Federation Double winners – i.e. League Championship and League Premiership OR League Championship and Federation/Waratah Cup OR League Premiership and Federation/Waratah Cup 
 Bold and Underlined  indicates Federation Treble winners – i.e. League Championship, League Premiership and Federation/Waratah Cup winners

Honours pre-NPL (1957–2012)

Source: SoccerAust
1 1996 season divided into two stages. Stage 1: Premiers (Adamstown), Runners-up (Sutherland)
2 1996 season divided into two stages. Stage 2: Premiers (Parramatta), Runners-up (Sutherland)

Bold indicates Federation Double winners – i.e. League Championship and League Premiership OR League Championship and Federation/Waratah Cup OR League Premiership and Federation/Waratah Cup 
Bold and Underlined  indicates Federation Treble winners – i.e. League Championship, League Premiership and Federation/Waratah Cup winners

All-time honour board

This list includes all champions and premiers since the inaugural league of 1957. Grand finals have occurred during all seasons of the league over this time. As the 1996 season was split into two stages there was no official premier for the season.

Broadcasting
As of 2012, all matches have been filmed and a weekly highlights package has been made available online, while the grand final has been streamed live through Football NSW since 2013.

See also

 National Premier Leagues NSW Women's

References

Notes

External links
New South Wales Premier League
Oz Football NSW Statistics
Weltfussballarchiv

New South Wales Premier League
1
National Premier Leagues
Sports leagues established in 2001
2001 establishments in Australia
Recurring sporting events established in 2001
Second level football leagues in Asia